Weary and Alford Company was an American architectural firm with partners Edwin Delos Weary and Willam Headley Alford. The firm was known for its design of office buildings and bank buildings and was headquartered in Chicago. The firm also employed Oscar Wenderoth, E. F. Weary, and R. D. Weary.  Several buildings designed by the firm are listed on the National Register of Historic Places (NRHP). 

Weary wrote a letter to a special committee of the U.S. Senate on issues facing the industry and building costs. He also wrote about wartime issues facing the industry in 1917 in Town Development He also wrote an article touting building bank buildings with the bank one floor above street level to allow for commerce on the ground floor to bring in rent.

Weary's brother Frank O. Weary was a prominent architect working out of Akron, Ohio and has several buildings listed on the NRHP.

Weary & Alford
First National Bank and Trust Building (1926), 43–53 Public Sq., Lima, Ohio, NRHP-listed Weary & Alford of Chicago, Illinois
Sioux Falls National Bank Building, 100 N. Phillips Ave., Sioux Falls, South Dakota, NRHP-listed Weary & Alford
City National Bank (Galveston, Texas) (1920), 2219 Ave. D, Galveston, Texas Weary & Alford Co. NRHP-listed
Noel State Bank, Chicago
Woodlawn Trust and Savings Bank, Chicago
Merchants National Bank (1926) at W 2nd Ave near 3rd St SE in Cedar Rapids, Iowa
American Commercial and Savings Bank (1927), at 203 W 3rd Street in Davenport, Iowa
Comerica Tower (Old Merchants National Bank and Trust Company Tower at 25 West Michigan Mall in Calhoun County, Michigan
Kalamazoo City Hall at 241 West South Street in Kalamazoo, Michigan

References

Defunct architecture firms based in Chicago